is a passenger railway station located in the city of Matsuyama, Ehime Prefecture, Japan. It is operated by the private transportation company Iyotetsu.

Lines
During most of the day, railway trains arrive every fifteen minutes. Trains continue from Matsuyama City Station on the Yokogawara Line to Yokogawara Station.

Layout
Minatoyama Station is an above-ground station with oneisland platforms and two tracks, and is unmanned. The station building is built directly on the end of the platform, and passengers must exit the ticket gate before using a level crossing to cross the track.

Adjacent stations

|-
!colspan=5|Iyotetsu

History
Minatoyama Station was opened on 21 September 1898 as a freight station. It was closed on 1 July 1907, and reopened as a passenger station on 1May 1931.

Surrounding area
Umeshinji Beach
Minatoyama Castle Ruins
Mitsuhama Port

See also
 List of railway stations in Japan

References

External links

Iyotetsu Station Information

Iyotetsu Takahama Line
Railway stations in Ehime Prefecture
Railway stations in Japan opened in 1931
Railway stations in Matsuyama, Ehime